The 2007 AFC U-16 Women's Championship was the second instance of the AFC U-16 Women's Championship. It was held from March 8 to 17 in Malaysia. The top three teams qualified for 2008 FIFA U-17 Women's World Cup.

Group stage

Group A

Group B

Knockout stage

Semi-finals

Third place match

Final

Winners

Qualified Teams
Following teams qualified 2008 FIFA U-17 Women's World Cup.

Goalscorers
7 goals
  Yun Hyon-hi

3 goals
  Ho Un-byol

2 goals

  Saki Takano
  Jon Myong-hwa

1 goal

  Kyah Simon
  Ma Jun
  Li Wei
  Lou Jiahui
  Wu Xuan
  Yang Li
  Nozomi Fujita
  Mana Iwabuchi
  Chinatsu Kira
  Kim Un-ju
  Ri Un-ae
  Ro Chol-ok
  Choi Eun-ji
  Ji So-yun
  Kim Jung-in
  Lee Hyun-young
  Park Hee-young
  Nattaya Dounjantuek
  Rattikan Thongsombut

Own goal
  Ryu Un-jong (for South Korea)

External links
 Asian Women U-16 Championship 2007 in RSSSF.com
 AFC U-16 Women's Championship 2007 in the-afc.com

AFC U-16 Women's Championship
AFC
Women
2007
2007 in Malaysian football
2007 in youth association football